Panče Stojanov (born 23 June 1975) is a former Macedonian international footballer who most recently was in charge of Akademija Pandev in the Macedonian First Football League.

International career
He made his senior debut for Macedonia in an August 2001 friendly match against Saudi Arabia and has earned a total of 12 caps, scoring no goals. His final international was an August 2002 friendly against Malta.

References

External sources
 
 Panče Stojanov at Footballdatabase

1975 births
Living people
Sportspeople from Strumica
Association football midfielders
Macedonian footballers
North Macedonia international footballers
FK Sileks players
FK Belasica players
FK Rabotnički players
FK Renova players
FK Horizont Turnovo players
Macedonian First Football League players
Macedonian Second Football League players
Macedonian football managers